The Austria men's national under-18 basketball team is a national basketball team of Austria, administered by the Austrian Basketball Federation. It represents the country in international under-18 basketball competitions.

FIBA U18 European Championship participations

See also
Austria men's national basketball team
Austria men's national under-16 basketball team
Austria women's national under-18 basketball team

References

External links
Archived records of Austria team participations

Basketball in Austria
Basketball
Men's national under-18 basketball teams